Cyrus B. Brown served as the 28th Secretary of State of Alabama and served from 1910 to 1915.

Before being elected Secretary of State, he served in the Air National Guard from 1899 to 1904 and he was clerk of the Legislature of Alabama from 1907 to 1911.

He got married on Nov. 16, 1904

References

alabama Democrats